Pococera robustella, the pine webworm moth, is a species of moth of the family Pyralidae. It is found in southern Canada and the eastern United States from Minnesota to New England and south to Florida.

The wingspan is 22–25 mm. Adults are grey to brownish. The basal third of the forewing is dark grey to black, while the rest of the forewing pale grey, becoming darker grey toward the outer half. The hindwings are brown with darker shading toward the outer margin. The number of generations per year varies from three in north-eastern Florida to one in the northern part of the range. In Florida, adults are on wing from April to October.

The larvae feed on the needles of various Pinus species. Young larvae mine the needles of their host plant. Later, they spin a nest of silk webbing and frass. They gather needles from around their nest and bring them back to the nest to eat. The web is occupied by several larvae. The larvae are light brown with darker longitudinal stripes and a light brown head with black pigmented markings.

Gallery

References

Moths described in 1848
Epipaschiinae
Moths of North America